Tumeremo is a town in the state of Bolívar in eastern Venezuela. It is the shire town of the Sifontes Municipality.

History 

Its first settlers were Guayan Indians and Kamaracotos, coming from the savanna of the Divina Pastora and Tupuquen located to the left margin of the river Yuruari. They fed on hunting, fishing, and agriculture. Tumeremo was founded on January 26, 1788 under the name of "Mission of Our Lady of Bethlehem of Tumeremo" by the Capuchin monks of Catalonia, among them: Fray Mariano de Perafita, Fray Bonaventura de Carrocera, Fray Joaquín María de Martorell, Fray Ramón Pruna and Fray Tomas de Santa Eugenia. Tumeremo means "Painted Snake", in the dialect of the first Indians who inhabited those lands. The friars establish several missions and an agricultural emporium based on livestock and cotton cultivation.
 
During the Campaign of Guayana, General Manuel Piar fought against the realists to seize the missions of Spain. After releasing Tumeremo, the Spanish survivors were imprisoned and sentenced to death. From there, the city was a strategic site and barracks for the patriot soldiers commanded by Simón Bolívar. From 1830 many indigenous and other populations began to emerge around Tumeremo.

In 1894, a group of British settlers who came from the British Guyana tried to establish themselves in what is now Sifontes Municipality. General Domingo Antonio Sifontes claimed the area on 2 March 1894 near El Dorado, where Venezuela established a military position. After expelling the settlers from the area, Sifontes became a local hero to Venezuelans in the area.

See also
 Tumeremo massacre

References

Populated places in Bolívar (state)